Die Störenfriede (The Troublemakers) is an East German children's film directed by Wolfgang Schleif. It was released in 1953.

See also
 List of East German films

External links
 
 

1953 films
East German films
1950s German-language films
German black-and-white films
1950s German films